Fort York was a provincial electoral district in Toronto, Ontario, Canada. It was created in 1987 and was subsequently abolished in 1999 when the ridings were redistributed to match their federal counterparts.  The riding had only two representatives:

 Bob Wong who was elected in the 1987 provincial election; and,
 Rosario Marchese who defeated Mr Wong in the 1990 provincial election.  He was subsequently re-elected when the riding was redistributed and renamed Trinity-Spadina prior to the 1999 provincial election.

Boundaries
The riding occupied the central downtown area of Toronto. The western border zigzagged from the Lake along Atlantic Avenue, Dovercourt Road and Ossington Avenue to Bloor Street. It then followed Bloor east to Bathurst Street, then south on Bathurst to College Street, then east on College and then on Carlton Street past Yonge Street to Sherbourne Street. It then went south on Sherbourne to the lake. It then followed the lakeshore west back to Atlantic. The riding also included the Toronto Islands.

Members of Provincial Parliament

Electoral results

References

Notes

Citations

External links
 Elections Ontario

Former provincial electoral districts of Ontario
Provincial electoral districts of Toronto
1987 establishments in Ontario
1996 disestablishments in Ontario